Bertsdorf-Hörnitz is a municipality in the Görlitz district, Saxony, Germany.

Althörnitz Castle was built between 1651 and 1654 for Christian von Hartig, mayor of Zittau. The von Sandersleben family owned it from 1881 until expropriation in 1945. It is now a hotel.

References 

Populated places in Görlitz (district)
Zittau Mountains